Sonu Beniwal (born 5 March 1993) is an Indian footballer who plays as a defender for Hindustan F.C. in the I-League 2nd Division.

Career

Pailan Arrows
Beniwal made his debut for Pailan Arrows in the I-League against Churchill Brothers on 9 January 2013 in which he came on as a 93rd-minute substitute for Shouvik Ghosh as Pailan Arrows lost the match 3–1.

Hindustan
In March 2015, it was announced that Beniwal had signed for Hindustan F.C. of the I-League 2nd Division.

International
Beniwal made his debut for India at international level at the under-19s level on 31 October 2011 against Turkmenistan in the first match for India in the 2012 AFC U-19 Championship qualifiers in which he played the whole 90 minutes as India's U19s won the match 3–1.

Career statistics

Club
Statistics accurate as of 11 May 2013

References

External links 
 

1993 births
Living people
I-League players
I-League 2nd Division players
Association football defenders
Indian footballers
Indian Arrows players
Footballers from Haryana